Ertuğrul (died c. 1280) was the father of Osman I, the founder of the Ottoman Empire.

Ertuğrul is also a Turkish name and may refer to:

Given name 
 Ertuğrul Apakan (born 1947), Turkish diplomat
 Ertuğrul Arslan (born 1980), Turkish footballer
 Ertuğrul Ergezen (born 1978), Turkish boxer
 Ertuğrul Günay (born 1948), Turkish politician
 Ertuğrul Işınbark (1940–2014), Turkish stage magician
 Ertuğrul Osman (1912–2009), Imperial Prince of the Ottoman Empire
 Ertuğrul Özkök (born 1947), Turkish journalist
 Ertuğrul Sağlam (born 1969), Turkish football coach and former player 
 Ertuğrul Taşkıran (born 1989), Turkish footballer
  (1912–1944), last crown prince of the Ottoman Empire
 Mustafa Ertuğrul Aker (1892–1961), Ottoman Army officer
 Ertuğrul Oğuz Fırat (1923–2014), Turkish composer, painter and poet
 Ertuğrul Kürkçü (born 1968), Turkish socialist and politician
 Ertuğrul Seçme (born 1965), Turkish football player and coach
 Ertuğrul Yalçınbayır (born 1946), Turkish lawyer and politician
  (born 1997), Austrian footballer
 Ertugrul Bayrak (born 1992), Dutch-Turkish kickboxer

Surname 
 Bülent Ertuğrul (born 1979), Turkish footballer
 Kent Ertugrul, American chief executive
 Muhsin Ertuğrul (1892–1979), Turkish theatre actor and director
 Münire Eyüp Ertuğrul (1902–1943), Turkish actress
 Çağlar Ertuğrul (born 1987), Turkish actor

Places 
 Ertuğrul Gazi Mosque, a mosque in Ashgabat, Turkmenistan
 Ertuğrul Tekke mosque, an mosque in Istanbul, Turkey
 Ertuğrul, Çorum, a village in Turkey
 Ertuğrul, Güney, a village in Turkey

Other 
 Diriliş: Ertuğrul, a Turkish television series running from 2014 to 2019
 Ertuğrul, sailing frigate of the Ottoman Navy
 Ertuğrul Bey, the main protagonist in Diriliş: Ertuğrul, based on the father of Osman
MT Botaş FSRU Ertuğrul Gazi, Turkish floating storage regasification unit

Turkish-language surnames
Turkish masculine given names

de:Tuğrul#Vorname, Form Ertuğrul
ru:Эртогрул (значения)